Karl-Heinz Muddemann (born 15 January 1950) is a German racing cyclist. He rode in the 1972 Tour de France.

References

External links
 

1950 births
Living people
German male cyclists
Place of birth missing (living people)
People from Unna (district)
Sportspeople from Arnsberg (region)
Cyclists from North Rhine-Westphalia